Kevorian Barnes (born August 10, 2003) is an American football running back for the UTSA Roadrunners.

Early years 
Barnes attended San Augustine High School where he was named to three straight All-District teams. Ranked the #124 running back in the class of 2021 he committed to play college football at University of Texas at San Antonio.

College career 
After redshirting in 2021 due to an injury, Barnes would become a contributor for the Roadrunners in 2022. On October 14, 2022, Barnes rushed for 128 yards and 2 touchdowns in a 30-10 win over FIU. In the 2022 Conference USA Championship Barnes would make his first career start, rushing for a career-high 175 yards in the Roadrunners 48-27 victory over North Texas. At the conclusion of the 2022 season, Barnes was named the Conference USA Freshman of the Year.

References

External links 
 UTSA Roadrunners bio

Living people
2003 births
People from San Augustine, Texas
Players of American football from Texas
American football running backs
UTSA Roadrunners football players